Andymori is Andymori's self-titled full-length debut album, released on . It was released simultaneously with a vinyl EP with tracks from the album, .

Unsigned singer Predawn contributed to chorus vocals in the track "Aoi Sora."

Background

The album was preceded by four months by the EP . Three tracks from the EP, "Bengal Tora to Whisky," "Everything Is My Guitar" and "Follow Me" were later put onto the album.

Promotion

Four tracks from the album had music videos: "Aoi Sora," "Everything Is My Guitar," "Follow Me," and "Life Is Party." All were directed by Masakazu Fukatsu (except for "Life Is Party," which was directed by Fukatsu and Shōji Shinya, one of the founders of Youth Records). "Follow Me" was later nominated for the Best New Artist video for the 2010 Space Shower Music Video Awards.

Track listing

All songs written by Sohey Oyamada. All songs performed by Andymori.

Japan Sales Rankings

References

Andymori albums
2009 debut albums